The Danish Grand Prix was an auto race for open-wheel cars. Last held for Formula One cars in 1962, the race is now defunct.

The Danish Grand Prix was held at the Roskilde Ring circuit near Roskilde. By standards of the era, the circuit was very small, at just three-quarters of a mile for the lap. Formula One cars were completing the lap in just over 42 seconds. The circuit ultimately limited the growth potential of the race, and the event was not considered to be added to the World Drivers Championship, but during its relatively short life in the 1960s, it did stage some memorable races.

Unusually for the time, the Grand Prix was actually decided over a series of heats, either four or three in number. The original race in 1960 was a Formula Two race won by Jack Brabham in a Cooper-Climax. The meeting was marred though by the death of emerging New Zealander George Lawton. The following year the race was upgraded to Formula One regulations and Stirling Moss took the win for the UDT Laystall Racing Team in a Lotus-Climax. Brabham returned to the top of the podium in 1962 running his own team driving a Lotus-Climax.

In 2017, a proposal to revive the race was put forward. Starting in 2020, the proposed event would be held on a street circuit in the Indre By and Christianshavn areas of Copenhagen and was designed by former Formula One driver Jan Magnussen and circuit architect Hermann Tilke.

Winners of the Danish Grand Prix

References 

 
Formula One non-championship races
National Grands Prix
Recurring sporting events established in 1960